Matteo Goffriller (1659–1742) was a Venetian luthier, particularly noted for the quality of his cellos. He was active between 1685–1735 and was the founder of the "Venetian School" of luthiers, during a time when Venice was one of the most important centers of musical activity in the world.

Biography
Although it is known that Goffriller was born in Brixen, little else is known of him prior to 1685 in Venice. 
Goffriller arrived in Venice in 1685 to work for luthier Martin Kaiser (Caiser). In 1685 he married Martin Kaiser's daughter Maddalena Maria Kaiser (Caiser), at the Madonna delle Grazie in Venice; she bore him twelve children (five boys and seven girls) in 26 years. Francesco Goffriller, long thought to be his brother, is now known to have been his son.

He was the founder of the "Venetian School" of luthiers, when Venice was one of the most important centers of musical activity in the world, and is believed to have taught luthiers Domenico Montagnana and Francesco Gobetti in addition to his son Francesco. After arriving in Venice, he is noted for being the city's sole violin and cello maker for some 25 years, between 1685 and 1710.

He died in Venice in 1742.

Mistaken identities
Goffriller's cellos had been erroneously attributed in the past to the Guarneri family, Carlo Bergonzi or even Antonio Stradivari and were virtually unknown until the 1920s, when they began to be discovered. The 1733 Goffriller cello once owned by Pablo Casals was originally attributed to Bergonzi. His earliest authenticated instrument is a viola da gamba dated 1689.

Goffriller labels
The standard label for a Goffriller instrument, whether genuine or forged, uses the Latin inscription Mattheus Goffriller Fece in Venezia Anno [date], identifying maker, city (Venice) and year made; the date is either printed or handwritten. But he actually labeled only a small percentage of the instruments in order to avoid paying Venetian taxes.

Legacy
Pablo Casals's Goffriller 1733 cello was his main concert instrument for most of his professional life. He acquired it in 1913 and played it until his death in 1973. Since 2000, winners of the International Pablo Casals Cello Competition in Kronberg, Germany may use it for two years. Terence Weil played another Goffriller used by Casals before the one he played between 1913 and 1973.

Other notable musicians who have used Goffriller instruments include:

Goffriller instruments

Violins

Violas

Cellos

Double basses

References

Bibliography
 Violin and Lute makers of Venice 1640 -176   by Stefano Pio, Ed. Venice research, Venezia 2004 www.veniceresearch.com
 Journal of The Violin Society of America, VSA papers Vol. XXI, No. 1 “The Life and Work of Matteo Goffriller of Venice 1659–1742” by Stefano Pio.

External links

" Matteo Goffriller Cello" by the John Dilworth on the Amati website.

1659 births
1742 deaths
Italian luthiers
People from Brixen